Ewa Gorzelak-Dziduch , often known as Ewa Gorzelak (born 3 November 1974 in Łódź, Poland) is a Polish television and film actress. She has appeared in a number of Polish movies and television soap operas and other series, including 55 episodes of the popular soap M jak miłość, in which she played lab technician Dorota Stadnicka. She is a graduate of the State Theatre Academy in Warsaw.

In December 2005, following the experience of her son's cancer treatment, she became one of the founders of the Nasze dzieci ("Our Children") charity foundation, which provides support to children with cancer and their families.

Filmography
 (1996)
 (1997) (TV mini-series)
 (1997)
 (1998) (TV series)
Amok (1998)
Dom (1 episode, 1999) (TV)
Skok (1999)
 (1999) (TV series)
Ostatnia misja (2000)
Zakochani (2000)
Na dobre i na złe (1 episode, 2000) (TV)
Tam i z powrotem (2002)
As (2002) (TV mini-series)
Na Wspólnej (2003) (TV series)
Pensjonat Pod Różą (2 episodes, 2006)
 (2007) (TV mini-series)
PitBull (1 episode, 2008) (TV)
M jak miłość (55 episodes, 2006–2009) (TV)
Ojciec Mateusz (1 episode, 2009) (TV)

References

External links

Polish actresses
1974 births
Living people
Actors from Łódź
Polish television actresses